Saprykin is a Russian masculine surname, its feminine counterpart is Saprykina. It may refer to

 Aleksandr Saprykin (1946–2021), Soviet volleyball player
 Haroldas Saprykinas (born 1995), Lithuanian basketball player 
 Igor Saprykin (born 1992), Russian ice hockey goaltender
 Oksana Saprykina (born 1979), Ukrainian road cyclist 
 Oleg Saprykin (born 1981), Russian ice hockey player
 Yevgeni Saprykin (born 1970), Soviet and Russian footballer

Russian-language surnames